The Midland Hotel Manchester is a grand hotel in Manchester, England. Opened in 1903, it was built by the Midland Railway to serve Manchester Central railway station, its northern terminus for its rail services to London St Pancras. It faces onto St Peter's Square. The hotel was designed by Charles Trubshaw in Edwardian Baroque style and is a Grade II* listed building.

History 

Built at the junction of Peter Street and Lower Mosley Street opposite Manchester Central railway station, terminus for Midland Railway express trains to London St Pancras, the hotel was designed by Charles Trubshaw and constructed between 1898 and 1903 for the Midland Railway Company at a cost of more than £1 million. In 1908, The Railway News reported that the hotel had over 70,000 guests in its first year and described it as a "Twentieth century palace". The hotel had a 1,000-seat purpose-built theatre where opera, drama and early Annie Horniman performances were staged, and a roof terrace where a string quartet performed.

The Midland Hotel was allegedly coveted by Adolf Hitler, who maintained a keen interest in architecture, as a possible Nazi headquarters in Britain. American intelligence speculated that the area of Manchester around the town hall was spared from bombing during the Second World War so as not to damage or destroy the Midland Hotel.

Charles Rolls met Henry Royce in the Midland Hotel, leading to the formation of Rolls-Royce Limited in 1904. Queen Elizabeth, the Queen Mother dined in the hotel's Trafford Restaurant in November 1959 after attending a Royal Variety Performance at the Palace Theatre. The Beatles were famously refused access to the French Restaurant for being "inappropriately dressed".

Architecture
The Midland has a steel structure clad in red brick, brown terracotta and several varieties of polished granite and Burmantofts terracotta to withstand the polluted environment of Manchester. This includes some fine modelled panels by the sculptor Edward Caldwell Spruce. The building shares some similarity with other highly decorative Edwardian Baroque buildings in Manchester such as London Road Fire Station and Lancaster House. The building has been designated a Grade II* listed building by English Heritage. The building was voted Greater Manchester's second-favourite building by readers of the Manchester Evening News in 2012.

Once known as the Crowne Plaza Manchester – The Midland, it was bought by the Paramount Hotel Group (now The Hotel Collection) in 2004. It was upgraded in a £12 million renovation and was transferred to QHotels, formerly Quintessential Hotels, Paramount's sister company.

The hotel was sold in 2018 to a partnership of the Swedish firm Pandox and the Israeli firm Fattal Hotels. The new owners undertook a £14m  renovation. , the Midland Hotel was operated by the Fattal Jurys Operation as a Leonardo Royal Hotel.

Hotel 

The hotel is close to Manchester Central exhibition and conference centre on the site of the former railway station, the Bridgewater Hall and Manchester Central Library. The hotel has 312 en-suite bedrooms and 14 suites, a health club and two restaurants – Adam Reid at The French and Mount Street Dining Room & Bar.

Restaurants
The French, once described by The Good Food Guide as "Manchester's finest dining room", was one of Britain's first Michelin-starred restaurants – awarded in 1974 in the first guide. It re-opened in March 2013 and chef Simon Rogan who stated his desire was to re-establish it to its former opulence and was rated the 12th best restaurant nationally in its first year of opening and awarded the best New Entry award by the The Good Food Guide. The French was awarded three Rosettes – the maximum permitted in the first year of opening.

The Colony was named after the cotton traders who sold raw cotton to mill owners and referred to themselves as the Old Colony Club. It closed for refurbishment in 2013 and re-opened in the September as Mr. Cooper's House & Garden in tribute to Thomas Cooper, whose house and gardens occupied the hotel site in 1819. The family were coach-makers and their garden was famous for its strawberries, gooseberries, apples and flowers.

Following a complete makeover, the restaurant is now called Mount Street Dining Room & Bar.

See also

Grade II* listed buildings in Greater Manchester
Listed buildings in Manchester-M60

References
Citations

Bibliography

External links
The Midland Manchester official website
"Flickr | Frank Wightman (1985) Manchester Archives+

Grade II* listed buildings in Manchester
Hotels in Manchester
Railway hotels in England
Charles Trubshaw buildings
Hotels established in 1903
Hotel buildings completed in 1903
1903 establishments in England